Galactoside 2-alpha-L-fucosyltransferase 2 is an enzyme that in humans is encoded by the FUT2 gene. It affects the secretor status of ABO antigens.

Approximately 20% of Caucasians are non-secretors due to the G428A (rs601338) and C571T (rs492602?) nonsense mutations in FUT2 and therefore have strong although not absolute protection from the norovirus GII.4.

References

Further reading